Albertha Wilhelmina Tideman-Wijers (8 January 1887 – 1 January 1976) was a Dutch composer who lived in Indonesia for almost two decades and incorporated Indonesian elements into her compositions. She published her music under the name Bertha Tideman-Wijers.

Wijers was born in Almelo. Her family moved to Berlin in 1900, where her first music teachers were her mother and Marie Tauszky. She later studied with Max Loewengaard and Wilhelm Klatte at the Stern Conservatory in Berlin, then with Ernst von Dohnanyi and Richard Roessler at the Berlin Hochschule fuer Musik (today the Berlin University of the Arts).

Wijers married Jan Tideman on 31 March 1910 and they had three children, Elisabeth, Bruno and Johanna. Tideman was a government official in the Maluku Islands in Indonesia, and they lived there until returning to the Netherlands in1929. Bruno unfortunately died while fighting in World War II.

Wijers' Small Suite for Carillon won a Visser-Neerlandia prize in 1959. Her papers are archived at the Netherlands Music Institute. Her music was published by Broekmans & van Poppel. Her compositions include:

Chamber 

Adagio en Andante Cantabile in F and D Major (viola and piano)

Andante Cantabile in A Major (viola and piano)

Small Suite for Carillon

Three Compositions for Carillon: Menuet, Interludium, Rondo

Film Soundtracks 

From the Realm of Crystals

Jan Pieter and His Sister

Orchestra 

Concertino for violin and chamber orchestra No.1

Concertino for violin and chamber orchestra No.2

Funeral March

Piano 

Beo's Song
Berceuse

Eastern Impressions

Karo-zang

Pieces for Piano, opus 5

Prelude and Fugue
Seven Elegies

Toba Fantasy

Variations

Vocal 

"Child's Talk" (voice and piano)

Four Dutch Songs, opus 3

Three Songs on a South African text (soprano and piano; text by Elisabeth Eybers)
Two cantatas

Variations on Valerius "Where that one already turns or turns" (violin, cello and piano; text by Catullus)

References 

1887 births
1976 deaths
Dutch composers
Dutch women composers
Dutch film score composers
Berlin University of the Arts alumni
Composers for carillon